Gavin James may refer to:

Sir Gavin Fullarton James, 4th Baronet (1859–1937), of the James baronets of Dublin
Gavin James (footballer) (born 1989), English-born Vincentian striker for Flackwell Heath
Gavin James (singer), Irish singer-songwriter 
Gavin James, CEO and CFO of Vertex (company)

See also
James Gavin (disambiguation)